Bhanwar Lal Sharma was an Indian politician and a former state president of Bharatiya Janata Party in Rajasthan. He was a former Member of Legislative Assembly from Hawa Mahal constituency in Rajasthan. He was a former minister of Higher Education and Sports in Rajasthan Government. 

He died on 29 May 2020 at the age of 95 from COVID-19.

References

Rajasthani politicians
State cabinet ministers of Rajasthan
2020 deaths
Rajasthani people
Bharatiya Jana Sangh politicians
Bharatiya Janata Party politicians from Rajasthan
1925 births
Rajasthan MLAs 2018–2023
Deaths from the COVID-19 pandemic in India